Yun is a Chinese surname, listed 41st in the  Song dynasty classic text Hundred Family Surnames.

The Chinese surname Yun (云) may be confused with the common Korean surname Yun (윤) which instead derives from the Chinese character 尹 (yǐn), meaning "governor".

Origin 
Very few outside cognates of Old Chinese *[ɢ]ʷən (Baxter-Sagart) exist. Starostin compares it with Mizo vân (“sky, the skies, heaven”) and Karbi inghun (“cloud”). It could possibly derive from a root meaning “to revolve”. Compare 運 (OC *[ɢ]ʷər-s, “to move”), 回 (OC *[ɢ]ʷˤəj, “to whirl, to circle”) (Schuessler, 2007). OC *[ɢ]ʷˤəj bears striking similarities to Ket -ga (Proto-Yenisseian *gaj).

Distribution 
Yun is a rare surname, being the 323rd most common surname in China and shared among 156,000 people as of 2013.

Tumeds 
Yun is the surname of many Tümeds, a Chinese-speaking Mongol ethnic group. Some Tumeds had the surname "Yun" during China's Qing Dynasty (1644–1912), and claim even more ancient origins. However, adoption of the surname greatly increased during the 1920s, and especially after the 1949 revolution, which increased Mongols' access to education. Mongolian names in the Mongolian language generally do not contain surnames, so Mongols chose surnames when registering for Chinese elementary school. In those schools, adoption of the Yun surname became a social norm for Tumeds, who are largely endogamous. The most famous Tumed with the surname "Yun" was Ulanhu, chairman of Inner Mongolia (1947–1966) and Vice President of China (1983–1988). During the 1980s and 1990s, the "Yun family" was identified with the dominant "West Mongol" (Tumed) faction in the Inner Mongolian government. The other two factions were that of the "East Mongols" (Khorchin tribe) and the Inner Mongolian Han. The perceived nepotism among the Yun family in Ulanhu's government was a frequent object of satire by government critics. According to anthropologist Uradyn Bulag,

One story tells that when someone went to the Inner Mongolian government building and shouted, "Lao [senior] Yun!" almost half of the office windows were opened. Realizing his mistake, the person shouted, "Xiao [junior] Yun!"; the other half of the windows then opened.... A similar story is that there were so many Yuns seeking to attend Ulahu's funeral in Beijing that it became difficult to buy train tickets.

Notable Chinese people

Historical figures 
 Yun Dingxing (云定兴), Sui dynasty general

Modern figures 
 Ulanhu (1906–1988), also known as Yun Ze (云泽), former Vice President of the People's Republic of China (1983–1988)
 Yun Bulong (云布龙; 1937–2000), former Chairman of Inner Mongolia (1998–2000)
 Yun Damian (云大棉; born 1935), CPC politician, member of the 8th and 9th CPPCC National Committees
 Hoon Thien How (云天豪; born 1986), Malaysian badminton player
 Wan Cheung (云翔; born 1967), better known as Scud, China-born Hong Kong film producer and director
 Melvin Hoon (@criminalmindd), notable artist in Singapore

Fictional characters 
 Wan Fei Yeung (云飞扬), protagonist of the 1979 Hong Kong TV series Reincarnated
Yun, a supporting character of the two novels of Avatar Kyoshi, in which he was mistaken to be the next Earth Avatar for sixteen long years.

References

External links 
 Further reading at Zhongwen Baike 
 Etymology of Yun 

Chinese-language surnames
Culture in Inner Mongolia
Individual Chinese surnames